Milkis (Korean: 밀키스) is a Korean soft drink produced by Lotte Chilsung, a South Korean beverage company. It combines many of the common elements of traditional carbonated beverages such as sugar, and carbonated water with milk to create a creamy taste; its label proclaims "New feeling of soda beverage".  Milkis is available in orange, strawberry, mango, melon, banana, peach, apple,  and classic (regular) flavors; the classic flavor is also featured as a glaze in pastries. It is a  popular beverage in South Korea, and it is available worldwide.

History
Milkis launched in 1989 with a huge marketing campaign, notably with the appearance of Hong Kong actor Chow Yun-fat in its television advertisements. Chow was enjoying huge popularity from the success of the film A Better Tomorrow and his saying the catchphrase "Saranghaeyo, Milkis!" (Korean: 사랑해요, 밀키스!, literally "I love you, Milkis!") in his strong accent became a huge hit; sales soared and the catchphrase remains as one of the most popular.

See also
Calpis
List of Korean beverages
Lotte Chilsung
Korean cuisine
Wahaha
Yakult

References

External links

South Korean drinks
Products introduced in 1989
Soft drinks